Trowers & Hamlins LLP is an international law firm with offices throughout the UK, Middle East and Far East. It has over 150 partners and more than 900 employees.  

Headquartered in London, Trowers & Hamlins was founded nearly 250 years ago.

History

In 1777 the practice was run by Richard and John Woodhouse. Since that time it has undergone more than 20 changes of identity and amalgamations. Walter Trower (who was knighted in 1915) joined the partnership in 1886, and the name Hamlin originated in a firm called Hamlin & Grammer which was practising in 1875. Though the two firms using these names had been in association for many years, it was not until 1987 that they finally integrated to become Trowers & Hamlins.

Offices

During the last 50 years Trowers & Hamlins has expanded considerably. The Manchester office opened in 1973, followed by the opening of offices in Oman (1980), Exeter (1984), Dubai (1991), Abu Dhabi (1993), Bahrain (1998) and Birmingham (2011). 

Trowers & Hamlins also merged with Devon-based law firm, Stones Solicitors (2015).  Outside the UK it has approximately 150 lawyers working across the Middle East.

In 2012 Trowers & Hamlins opened a non-trading representative office in Kuala Lumpur, Malaysia, having secured unique approval from the Malaysia Investment Development Authority (MIDA). Trowers & Hamlins was the first foreign firm to open in this manner in Malaysia. In 2015, the firm was the first foreign law firm to receive a Qualified Foreign Law Firm licence in Malaysia and now operates an office there. Today, Trowers & Hamlins has over 860 staff in its UK, Middle East and Far East offices.

References

External links
Trowers & Hamlins Website

Law firms based in London
Multinational companies based in the City of London
Law firms established in 1987
British companies established in 1987
1987 establishments in England